The 2022 Oceania Badminton Championships was the continental badminton championships in Oceania sanctioned by the Badminton Oceania, and Badminton World Federation. It had been announced that most of the events in the Oceania Badminton Championships for 2022 were cancelled, including the Men's and Women's Team Championships, due to New Zealand's COVID-19 related border restrictions. However, the individual tournaments were postponed with the possibility of taking place in week 17 of the BWF tournament calendar.

This championship was organized by Badminton Victoria, and was the 16th edition of the Oceania Badminton Championships. It was held in Melbourne, Australia from 28 April to 1 May 2022.

Venue  
The tournament was held at the Melbourne Sports and Aquatic Centre, Melbourne, Australia.

Medal summary

Medalists

Medal table

Men's singles

Seeds 

 Abhinav Manota (quarter-finals)
 Anthony Joe (third round)
 Pit Seng Low (second round)
 Jacob Schueler (quarter-finals)
 Adam Dolman (third round)
 Keith Mark Edison (second round)
 Edward Lau (champion)
 Jack Yu (third round)

Finals

Top half

Section 1

Section 2

Bottom half

Section 3

Section 4

Women's singles

Seeds 

 Chen Hsuan-yu (champion)
 Louisa Ma (final)
 Tiffany Ho (semi-finals)
 Shaunna Li (withdrew)

Finals

Top half

Section 1

Section 2

Bottom half

Section 3

Section 4

Men's doubles

Seeds 

 Lin Ying Xiang / Teoh Kai Chen (semi-finals)
 Vincent Nguyen / Pham Le The Hung (second round)
 Eric Vuong /  Maika Phillips (second round)
 Abhinav Manota / Jack Wang (champion)

Finals

Top half

Section 1

Section 2

Bottom half

Section 3

Section 4

Women's doubles

Seeds 

 Joyce Choong / Sylvina Kurniawan (champion)
 Erena Calder-Hawkins / Jasmin Ng (withdrew)

Bracket

Mixed doubles

Seeds 

 Oliver Leydon-Davis / Anona Pak (final)
 Pham Tran Hoang / Sylvina Kurniawan (second round)
 Edward Lau / Shaunna Li (withdrew)
 Ryan Tong / Janice Jiang (withdrew)

Finals

Top half

Section 1

Section 2

Bottom half

Section 3

Section 4

References

External links 
 Oceania Championships 2022
 Individual Tournament Link

Oceania Badminton Championships
Oceania Badminton Championships
International sports competitions hosted by Australia
Badminton tournaments in Australia
Oceania Badminton Championships